Hiera is a monotypic moth genus in the subfamily Arctiinae. It contains the single species Hiera gyge, which is found in Panama. Both the genus and species were first described by Herbert Druce in 1885.

Etymology
Hiera is Greek for a temple or sacred place.

References

External links

Arctiini
Moths described in 1885
Monotypic moth genera